All That Glitters or All That Glisters may refer to:

 All that glitters is not gold, a well-known saying

Literature
 All That Glitters (novel), by V. C. Andrews
 All That Glitters, a novel by Michael Anthony
 All That Glitters, a memoir by Pearl Lowe
 "All That Glitters", the first part of the Bionicle comic Journey's End
 “ All That Glitters: A Novel Of Washington”, by Frances Parkinson Keyes

Stage, film and television
 All That Glitters is Not Gold, an 1851 comic drama by Thomas Morton and John Maddison Morton
 All That Glitters (1936 film), a British film directed by Maclean Rogers
 All That Glitters, a 2001 film later retitled Glitter
 All That Glitters (TV series), a 1977 American sitcom
 All That Glitters, a proposed 1984 American series that resulted in Code of Vengeance
 All That Glitters: Britain's Next Jewellery Star, a BBC reality TV series hosted by Katherine Ryan

Episodes
 "All That Glitters" (Adventures of Superman)
 "All That Glitters" (Ben 10: Alien Force)
 "All That Glitters..." (Eureka)
 "All That Glitters" (Lost in Space)
 "All That Glitters", an episode of Make It or Break It
 "All That Glitters!" (Pokémon: Johto League Champions)
 "All That Glitters..." (Sex and the City)
 "All That Glisters" (Space: 1999)
 "All That Glitters" (SpongeBob SquarePants)

Music
 "All That Glitters", a song by Orchestral Manoeuvres in the Dark from the album Sugar Tax
 "All That Glitters", a song by Le Tigre from the EP From the Desk of Mr. Lady
 "All That Glitters Isn't Gold", a song by The Cover Girls from the album We Can't Go Wrong
 "All That Glitters Is a Mares Nest" by Cardiacs

Gaming
 All That Glitters... (module), an adventure module for the Dungeons & Dragons fantasy role-playing game

See also
 "All that is gold does not glitter", a poem by J. R. R. Tolkien